Neuburg Castle (Bavaria)
 Neuburg Castle (Switzerland)